Rensselaer Rail Station, signed as Albany–Rensselaer on its platforms, is a train station in Rensselaer, New York, located  from downtown Albany across the Hudson River. Operated by the Capital District Transportation Authority, it serves as Amtrak's primary station for the Capital District. To emphasize the station's location across the river from Albany, as well as to distinguish from the Rensselaer station in Indiana, Amtrak refers to the station as "Albany–Rensselaer."

It is served by Amtrak's Empire Corridor routes, including the Lake Shore Limited, whose Boston and New York sections diverge at the station.

 it was Amtrak's ninth-busiest station, as well as the busiest to serve a metro area with a population smaller than 2 million– a distinction it has held since at least 2010. This is primarily due to the large number of passengers who commute to and from New York City.

History

The present station is the third on the site. The first station was built in 1968, and the second in 1980. Before 1968, trains stopped at Union Station in Albany. That building, located on Broadway, now houses the northeast headquarters of Bank of America (via predecessors Fleet Bank and Norstar Bank). The New York Central Railroad had plans to leave Albany, in part because Interstate 787 needed the space occupied by a rail yard, but the move took place under Penn Central's watch.

The 1968 building was torn down in order to expand the station's parking facility. The current structure was completed in September 2002 and opened on September 22.  It was designed by the Schenectady architecture firm Stracher–Roth Gilmore and the New York firm Vollmer Associates, with Ryan-Biggs of Troy providing structural engineering, Sage/Engineering Associates providing MEP engineering services, Erdman Anthony of Troy providing facilities engineering, and constructed by U. W. Marx/Bovis joint venture. The station was originally intended to have four tracks, but was built with only three due to cost concerns, leaving the station with fewer than preferable tracks. In October 2008, it was announced that a fourth track would be built after the two previous terminal buildings were demolished; a contract for that work was assigned at the same time. Design work was proceeding on the fourth track as of February 2010, but actual construction was placed on hold pending resolution of funding issues and demolition of the two terminal buildings to the north.

On October 27, 2010, demolition of the two other buildings began. In a December 4, 2012 press release, Amtrak indicated that installation of the fourth track would begin in 2013, and the project was completed in March 2016.

In March 2020, Adirondack and Ethan Allen Express service was suspended north of Albany–Rensselaer as part of a round of service reductions in response to the ongoing coronavirus pandemic. Ethan Allen Express service was restored in July 2021.

The train reverses direction at this station.

Station layout

The two floor station features a large main lobby that contains a coffee shop, a newsstand, and a post office. Trains call at two high-level island platforms serving two tracks in each direction. The platforms are connected to the main building by an aerial walkway that is accessed by stairs, escalator and elevator. Each  platform can accommodate up to 7 Amfleet cars, not including an engine.

Transportation services

Amtrak

The station's busiest route is the Empire Service, with seven round trips to New York City, five of which originate and terminate here. It is the descendant of the New York Central's express trains running along the eastern leg of the famed "Water Level Route" to Chicago.

With the exception of the Boston branch of the Lake Shore Limited, all trains have southbound service to Penn Station in New York City.
Adirondack to Montreal
Empire Service: all trains to New York (via Hudson, Rhinecliff, Poughkeepsie, Croton-on-Hudson, Yonkers); most northbound trains terminate here; two trains per day continue to Buffalo and Niagara Falls.
Ethan Allen Express to Burlington, Vermont
Lake Shore Limited to Syracuse, Rochester, Buffalo, Cleveland, Toledo, and Chicago
New York Branch (Train 48/49): Poughkeepsie, Croton-on-Hudson, New York (Penn Station)
Boston Branch (Train 448/449): Pittsfield, Springfield, Worcester, Framingham, Boston (Back Bay), Boston (South Station)
Maple Leaf to Toronto
Berkshire Flyer to Pittsfield

Southbound, most non-Empire Service trains swap out a diesel GE P42DC locomotive for a dual mode P32AC-DM, since non-electric locomotives are not permitted in Penn Station. The P42DC is readied for a train coming northbound from New York City.

Bus

The intercity Megabus operates regular service to New York City and Ridgewood, N.J. Temporary Amtrak Thruway Motorcoach services due to track service work also serve the station from its bus bays.

Two bus routes operated by the Capital District Transportation Authority, the local public transportation agency, serve the station:
114-Madison/Washington: Every 30 minutes during the day, and every hour on nights and weekends.
214-Rensselaer/Third Street-Amtrak: Every 30 minutes during rush hours, every 40 minutes during the day and about every hour on nights and weekends.

Vermont Translines buses to and from Burlington, Vermont stop at the station as well. These routes are also through-ticketed with Amtrak and Greyhound Lines.

References

External links

CDTA station page for Rensselaer

Amtrak stations in New York (state)
Transportation buildings and structures in Rensselaer County, New York
Railway stations in the United States opened in 1968
1968 establishments in New York (state)
Railway stations in the United States opened in 1980
1980 establishments in New York (state)
Railway stations in the United States opened in 2002
2002 establishments in New York (state)
Transportation in Rensselaer County, New York
Railway stations in Rensselaer County, New York
Former Penn Central Transportation stations